Gällivare Municipality (or Váhčira gielda) is a municipality in Norrbotten County in northern Sweden. Its seat is  Gällivare. The municipality is the third biggest in Sweden.

Gällivare Municipality also hosts an airport, Gällivare Airport. It is the nearest airport to the national parks Sarek and Padjelanta, making it popular for hikers.

Gällivare is also the central place for The Firstborn Laestadianism.

Gällivare Municipality is a multilingual municipality, as a sizeable share of the population is made up of  Meänkieli, Finnish and Sami speakers.

Nearly 40 cases of the rare genetic disorder CIPA have been reported in Gällivare.

Localities and settlements

There are six localities (or urban areas) in Gällivare Municipality:

The municipal seat in bold

Other settlements 
 Flakaberg
 Kääntöjärvi
 Sangervaara

Elections

Riksdag
These are the results of the elections to the Riksdag since the 1972 municipal reform. Norrbotten Party also contested the 1994 election but due to the party's small size at a nationwide level SCB did not publish the party's results at a municipal level. The same applies to the Sweden Democrats between 1988 and 1998. "Turnout" denotes the percentage of eligible voters casting any ballots, whereas "Votes" denotes the number of actual valid ballots cast.

Blocs

This lists the relative strength of the socialist and centre-right blocs since 1973, but parties not elected to the Riksdag are inserted as "other", including the Sweden Democrats results from 1988 to 2006, but also the Christian Democrats pre-1991 and the Greens in 1982, 1985 and 1991. The sources are identical to the table above. The coalition or government mandate marked in bold formed the government after the election. New Democracy got elected in 1991 but are still listed as "other" due to the short lifespan of the party.

Sister cities
Gällivare Municipality has four sister cities:

 Tysfjord, Norway
 Kittilä, Finland
 Kirovsk, Russia
 Barga, Italy

Annual festivals
 Flottkalaset

References

External links

Gällivare Municipality - Official site 
Town twinning ceremony with Barga, Italy

 
Municipalities of Norrbotten County
Meänkieli language municipalities
Sámi-language municipalities